Dick Guy (4 April 1937 – 16 May 2018) was an Australian cricketer. A leg-spin bowler, he played eight first-class matches for New South Wales between 1960/61 and 1968/69.

See also
 List of New South Wales representative cricketers

References

External links
 

1937 births
2018 deaths
Australian cricketers
New South Wales cricketers
Cricketers from Sydney
Australia national cricket team selectors